Daniel Robert Anderson (born March 3, 1986) is an American musician and record producer, and one of the founding members of the alternative rock band Idiot Pilot and dance/electronic band Glowbug. His side projects include Tarantula Tapes and the Ghost and the Grace. He is a multi-instrumentalist and vocalist.

History 
In 2010, Anderson officially held the fifth highest score ever recorded on Nintendo's Tetris. He has a brief cameo in the season 8 episode of CSI: New York, "Kill Screen", which is about competitive gaming.

Recently, Anderson recorded guitar on rapper Hyro Da Hero's upcoming album, Birth, School, Work, Death.

On October 14, 2010, Anderson released an EP of electronic and dance music under the moniker, Glowbug.

In late 2013, Anderson announced a musical collaboration with Lourdes Hernández of Russian Red, called Spectorize.

Discography

With Idiot Pilot 

Studio albums
Strange We Should Meet Here (2005)
Wolves (2007)
Blue Blood (2019)

With The Ghost and the Grace 

Studio albums
Behold! A Pale Horse (2009)

With Glowbug 

Studio albums
Mr. Plastic (2011)
Suit of Swords (2012)
Wordless (2014)
Headhunters (2015)
Fantasma Del Tropico (2017)
Weezing (2018)
Vampire Empire (2020)
The Bumblebee King (2021)
Your Funeral (2022)

With Ancient Lasers 
Studio albums
You In The Future (2013)
In Quicksand (2015)
Artifact Wavs (2016)
No Photos on God Mode (2018)

References

External links

 (Archived)

1986 births
Living people
21st-century multi-instrumentalists
American multi-instrumentalists
American punk rock guitarists
American rock guitarists
American male guitarists
American rock singers
Singers from Washington (state)
Record producers from Washington (state)
People from Bellingham, Washington
21st-century American guitarists
Guitarists from Washington (state)
21st-century American male singers
21st-century American singers